A Quiet Drink, is the third novel by English author Deborah Moggach, first published in 1980. Unlike her previous two novels it departs from the autobiographical.

Plot introduction
The book is set in London and concerns Claudia a magazine editor whose husband has just left her, Steve Mullen a cosmetics rep, and his wife June. Claudia is still yearning after her husband but then finds herself a lodger, the mysterious Alistair; a librarian who keeps a diary which Claudia is desperate to read. Steve is realising his marriage to the June is beginning to lose its sparkle, whilst June has given up her job and is spending time at the library trying to educate herself.

Eventually Steve and Claudia meet and go for 'a quiet drink' which has far-reaching consequences...

Publication history 
1980, UK, Collins, Hardback
1985, US, St. Martin's Press, Hardback
1991, UK, Mandarin/Arrow, Pub date 01 Jul 1991, Paperback

References

External links
 Author webpage

Novels set in London
1980 British novels
Novels by Deborah Moggach
William Collins, Sons books